John Wickham may refer to:

John Wickham (British Army officer) (born 1897), British brigadier, on List of British generals and brigadiers
John Wickham (attorney) (1763–1839), 18th-century American attorney
John A. Wickham, Jr. (born 1928), 20th-century American general
John Clements Wickham (1798–1864), 19th-century British ship captain, later a police magistrate in Brisbane, Queensland, Australia
John L. C. Wickham (1919–2018), Western Australian Supreme Court judge
John Wickham (urologist), 1927–2017